Bunbury is a surname. Notable people with the surname include:

 Alex Bunbury (born 1967), former Canadian association footballer
 Sir Edward Bunbury, 9th Baronet (1811–1895), British Liberal Party politician
 Enrique Bunbury, (born 1967) Spanish singer-songwriter
 Henry William Bunbury (1750–1811), English caricaturist
 Sir Henry Bunbury, 7th Baronet (1778–1860), British soldier and historian
 Kylie Bunbury (born 1989), Canadian-American actress
 Teal Bunbury (born 1990), Canadian-born American soccer player
 Thomas Bunbury (disambiguation), several people by this name
 Turtle Bunbury, (born 1972) historian and author based in Ireland

See also
Bunbury baronets
Richardson-Bunbury baronets

fr:Bunbury